Gouverneur Morris (1752–1816) was an American statesman.

Governor Morris may also refer to:
Lewis Morris (governor) (1671–1746), 8th Colonial Governor of New Jersey
Luzon B. Morris (1827–1895), 55th Governor of Connecticut
Robert Hunter Morris (1700–1764), Governor of Colonial Pennsylvania
Valentine Morris (1727–1789), Governor of St. Vincent from 1772 to 1779